The  was a large caliber railroad gun acquired by the Imperial Japanese Army from the French arms manufacturer Schneider in 1930. The Type 90 designation was given to this gun as it was accepted in the year 2590 of the Japanese calendar (1930). It was the only railroad gun in Japanese service.

History and development

The Imperial Japanese army had made extensive use of armoured trains since the Russo-Japanese War, and Japanese military advisors in Europe during World War I had noted the development of railway guns, whereby extremely large caliber weapons, such as previously found only on battleships, could be made mobile and could be rapidly deployed to front-line combat areas.

However, despite this interest, other projects had higher priority, and nothing was done until funding was found to purchase a single sample unit from Schneider in France in 1930. Only the gun body (barrel with a breech-lock) was purchased from Schneider, and the railway carriage and auxiliary equipment was all produced locally in Japan. The completed assembly was designated as the Type 90 240mm railway gun.

The gun itself was not, strictly, a Schneider gun. It was designed by FAMH (Saint-Chamond) as part of the French TLP (très longue portée, “very long range”) projects. Approval for the Saint-Chamond long range gun was granted in November 1918 and the gun was tested in 1926. The maximum range achieved was 59,000m with a 240mm L/51 barrel. The Saint-Chamond gun was unusual for a large calibre railway gun because it was designed with 360° traverse on a carriage which had an auxiliary engine which gave limited autonomy to the railway gun.  The firm of Schneider et Cie had taken over FAMH in 1924 and since Schneider had its own TLP projects the Saint-Chamond design became superfluous.

Combat record

The Type 90 240mm Railway Gun was initially deployed as a coastal artillery battery at Futtsu, Chiba, as part of the defenses guarding the entrance to Tokyo Bay. It was redeployed to Manchukuo in 1941, and based in the Hulin area of Heilongjiang, as part of the defenses against the Soviet Union, where it remained for the duration of World War II. When the Soviet Union invaded Manchukuo in the closing days of the war, the gun was destroyed by retreating Kwantung Army forces and abandoned.

References

Notes

Bibliography
 Bishop, Chris (eds) The Encyclopedia of Weapons of World War II. Barnes & Nobel. 1998. 
 Chant, Chris. Artillery of World War II, Zenith Press, 2001, 
 War Department Special Series No 25 Japanese Field Artillery October 1944
 US Department of War, TM 30-480, Handbook on Japanese Military Forces, Louisiana State University Press, 1994.

External links

 
 US Technical Manual E 30-480

240 mm artillery
9
Railway guns
Military equipment introduced in the 1930s